Norbert Schlegel (born March 9, 1961 in Sassanfahrt) is a German former footballer who became a coach.

References

1961 births
Living people
German footballers
German football managers
1. FC Nürnberg players
1. FC Saarbrücken players
Hertha BSC players
SpVgg Greuther Fürth players
Bundesliga players
Association football midfielders